In mathematics, the Gibbons–Hawking ansatz is a method of constructing gravitational instantons introduced by . It gives examples of hyperkähler manifolds in dimension 4 that are invariant under a circle action.

See also 
 Gibbons–Hawking space

References
 
 
 

1978 introductions
Differential geometry
General relativity
Stephen Hawking